Rok Rozman (born 2 January 1988 in Kranj) is a Slovenian rower who represented Slovenia at the 2008 Summer Olympics, Men's coxless four. His team took fourth place.

References 

3. Earth's Great Rivers: Series 2 episode 2 “Danube” BBC2  https://www.bbc.co.uk/programmes/m0015qj3

Living people
Slovenian male rowers
Olympic rowers of Slovenia
Rowers at the 2008 Summer Olympics
Sportspeople from Kranj
1988 births
21st-century Slovenian people